Alan Nigel Kernaghan (born 25 April 1967) is a football manager and former professional player.

As a player, he was a defender from 1985 to 2006, notably in the Premier League for Manchester City and in the Football League for Middlesbrough, Charlton Athletic, Bolton Wanderers and Bradford City. He played the final nine years of his career playing in Scotland with St Johnstone, Brechin City, Clyde, Livingston, Falkirk and Dundee. Born in England, he was capped 26 times by the Republic of Ireland, scoring one goal.

During his coaching career, Kernaghan has managed Scottish clubs Clyde and Dundee, and Glentoran in the Northern Irish league, which he resigned from after an embarrassing 3–2 defeat to struggling Championship side Annagh United. He has also worked for other clubs in a variety of coaching roles.

Club career
Born in Otley, West Yorkshire, England, Kernaghan moved with his family to Bangor, County Down at the age of four. He represented Northern Ireland at schoolboy level and the Republic of Ireland at senior level. He began his playing career as an apprentice at Middlesbrough, and went on to make 212 appearances during an eight-year period, scoring 16 goals.

In September 1993, Kernaghan was signed for Manchester City by then-boss Brian Horton. He went on loan to various clubs—Bolton Wanderers in 1994, Bradford City in 1996, and then to St Johnstone in 1997. The Saints signed him on a permanent deal just before the end of the year, after he was given a free transfer from Manchester City. He enjoyed four years at McDiarmid Park, making 60 league appearances and scoring five goals.
Kernaghan then joined Brechin City, but he made only three competitive appearances for the club. He then moved to Clyde, where he started as a player but was promoted to a player/manager role in the 2003–04 season. He guided Clyde to a second-placed finish in the First Division, behind Inverness Caley Thistle, a division which they led for the majority of the season. Kernaghan made 63 appearances for Clyde as a player, scoring three goals.

Kernaghan's next move was to Livingston as assistant manager to Allan Preston. He was on a player/assistant manager role at the club, making four first team appearances for Livingston, but he was sacked along with Preston after a poor run of results. Kernaghan next moved to Falkirk, where he took up a player/coach role. He made nine appearances for the Bairns but left the club on 2 September 2005.

International career
Brought up in Bangor, Northern Ireland, Kernaghan played for Northern Ireland Schoolboys six times. However, as the Irish Football Association policy at the time did not select players who were not or whose parents were not born in Northern Ireland, he wasn't selected for the senior team. Due to his grandmother being an Irish citizen he was entitled to Irish citizenship, and he was selected by Jack Charlton to play for the Republic of Ireland. Kernaghan earned 22 caps, scored one goal and was selected for the 1994 FIFA World Cup.

Managerial and coaching career
Kernaghan left Clyde to take up the role as manager of Dundee. He was removed from the position, after an unsuccessful spell, in April 2006. Kernaghan became the first former Republic of Ireland player to hold a coaching role at Rangers. He left this position in February 2012 to join Brentford. Kernaghan made an appearance as a player during a 2013–14 pre-season friendly versus FC Einheit Rudolstadt, replacing Aaron Pierre after 65 minutes. He left Brentford in December 2013, after new manager Mark Warburton decided to make changes to the club's coaching staff.

Kernaghan was appointed manager of Glentoran in November 2015. Losing to Annagh United in the League Cup on 30 August 2016 was the final game in charge for Kernaghan, he then tendered his resignation after the game.

Personal life 
Kernaghan has Type 1 diabetes.

See also
 List of Republic of Ireland international footballers born outside the Republic of Ireland

References

External links
 
 Interview regarding nationality
 First interview as Glentoran Manager

1967 births
Living people
British people of Irish descent
People from Otley
Association football defenders
Republic of Ireland association footballers
Association footballers from Northern Ireland
Republic of Ireland international footballers
1994 FIFA World Cup players
Republic of Ireland international footballers from Northern Ireland
Middlesbrough F.C. players
Charlton Athletic F.C. players
Manchester City F.C. players
Bolton Wanderers F.C. players
Bradford City A.F.C. players
St Johnstone F.C. players
Brechin City F.C. players
Falkirk F.C. players
Livingston F.C. players
Clyde F.C. players
English Football League players
Premier League players
Scottish Premier League players
Scottish Football League players
Scottish Football League managers
Clyde F.C. managers
Dundee F.C. managers
Rangers F.C. non-playing staff
Livingston F.C. non-playing staff
Brentford F.C. managers
Glentoran F.C. managers
Football managers from Northern Ireland
People with type 1 diabetes